Millgrove was a railway station on the Warburton line in Millgrove, Melbourne, Australia, which operated until the line's closure in 1965. There are no remains left of this station.

External links
Millgrove station shortly after closing, 24 November 1964.

Disused railway stations in Melbourne
Railway stations in Australia opened in 1901
Railway stations closed in 1965
1965 disestablishments in Australia